Robert J. Hillery (born November 15, 1964) is an American former handball player who competed in the 1988 Summer Olympics.

References

1964 births
Living people
Sportspeople from Queens, New York
American male handball players
Olympic handball players of the United States
Handball players at the 1988 Summer Olympics